Samajwadi Janata Dal (Democratic) was a political party in India. Devendra Prasad Yadav is the leader of the party. The election symbol of the party is an air conditioner. On 24 March 2022, SJD(D) merged with Rashtriya Janata Dal.

History
Party was founded by Devendra Prasad Yadav in year 2010. Party was a member of Grand Democratic Secular Front formed with All India Majlis-e-Ittehadul Muslimeen leader Asaduddin Owaisi.

References

Political parties in Bihar
Political parties established in 2010
2010 establishments in Bihar